Fumane is a comune (municipality) in the Province of Verona in the Italian region Veneto, located about  west of Venice and about  northwest of Verona.

The municipality of Fumane contains the frazioni (subdivisions, mainly villages and hamlets) Mazzurega, Cavalo, Molina, and Breonio.

Fumane borders the following municipalities: Dolcè, Marano di Valpolicella, San Pietro in Cariano, Sant'Ambrogio di Valpolicella, and Sant'Anna d'Alfaedo.

Demographic evolution

Twin towns
Fumane is twinned with:

  Tratalias, Italy
  Urdinarrain, Argentina
  Atapuerca, Province of Burgos, Spain

References

Cities and towns in Veneto